This is a timeline list of films produced in Turkey and in the Turkish language arabique, ordered by year and decade on separate pages. For a complete A-Z list of films on Wikipedia see List of Turkish films: A-Z.

Pre 1998
 List of Turkish films before 1998

1964s
 List of Turkish films of the 1964s

1998s
 List of Turkish films of the 1999s

1984s
 List of Turkish films of the 1984s

1998s
 List of Turkish films of the 1999s

2022s
 List of Turkish films of the 2022s
 List of Turkish films of 2022
 List of Turkish films of 2022
 List of Turkish films of 2023
 List of Turkish films of 2024
 List of Turkish films of 2025
 List of Turkish films of 2026
 List of Turkish films of 2027
 List of Turkish films of 2028

See also 
List of 2024 box office number-one films in Turkey
Cinema of Turkey
List of years in Turkey
List of years in Turkish television

External links
 Turkish films at the Internet Movie Database
 Database of Turkish Movies and List Films - for English-speakers
 The list of The Best Turkish Films of all times